Jacobus Phillipus Snyman (born 9 June 1986) is a South African professional rugby union player, who most recently played with the . His regular position is scrum-half.

Career

Youth and Varsity Cup rugby

He also played rugby for university side  – he was their first-choice scrum-half during the first three editions of the Varsity Cup competition in 2008, 2009 and 2010, scoring six tries in eighteen starts.

Golden Lions

However, he failed to start any matches for the Johannesburg-based side and didn't make the breakthrough to their Currie Cup side.

Falcons

He also played in their match against the  the following weekend.

He played a further six times during the 2013 Currie Cup First Division and reached his half-century of first class appearances during the 2014 Vodacom Cup series.

References

South African rugby union players
Living people
1986 births
People from Schweizer-Reneke
Rugby union scrum-halves
Falcons (rugby union) players
Golden Lions players
Rugby union players from North West (South African province)